Michael Fitzwalter (also Miguel Gualtero)(died 1601) was a Roman Catholic prelate who served as Auxiliary Bishop of Seville (1596–1601). He was also named Bishop of Ardfert and Aghadoe (1591-1601) but never assumed the bishopric.

Biography
Michael Fitzwalter was born in Ireland and attended the English College of St Gregory in Seville, Spain. On 9 August 1591, Michael Fitzwalter was appointed by Pope Gregory XIV as Bishop of Ardfert and Aghadoe and consecrated in Venice on 15 August 1591. Although appointed Bishop of Ardfert and Aghadoe, he never returned to Ireland and the diocese was administered by Vicars Apostolic in his absence. In 1596, he was appointed by Pope Clement VIII as Auxiliary Bishop of Seville where he served until his death at Alcala del Rio, Spain in 1601.

While bishop, he was the principal co-consecrator of Antonio de Raya Navarrete, Bishop of Cuzco (1594).

References

External links and additional sources
 (for Chronology of Bishops) 
 (for Chronology of Bishops) 

1601 deaths
16th-century Roman Catholic bishops in Spain
17th-century Roman Catholic bishops in Ireland
Bishops appointed by Pope Gregory XIV
Bishops appointed by Pope Clement VIII